Gregory Walter Graffin (born November 6, 1964) is an American singer and evolutionary biologist. He is most recognized as the lead vocalist and only constant member of punk rock band Bad Religion, which he co-founded in 1980. He embarked on a solo career in 1997, when he released the album American Lesion. His follow-up album, Cold as the Clay, was released nine years later. His newest solo work is Millport, released in 2017. 

Graffin obtained his PhD in zoology at Cornell University and has lectured courses in natural sciences at both the University of California, Los Angeles and at Cornell University.

Career

Bad Religion

In 1980, at the age of 15, Graffin and a few high school classmates formed Bad Religion in Southern California's San Fernando Valley. After making a name for themselves in the Los Angeles punk scene, releasing two EPs and two full-length albums, they disbanded around 1985. However, Bad Religion reformed in 1986 with a new line-up, consisting of Graffin on vocals, Brett Gurewitz and Greg Hetson on guitars, Jay Bentley on bass, and Pete Finestone on drums. In 1988, they released Suffer, which was a comeback for Bad Religion as well as a watershed for the Southern California punk sound popularized by guitarist Gurewitz's Epitaph Records. The reunion line-up made two more records before Finestone left the band in 1991.

Bad Religion has been known for its articulate and often politically charged lyrics as well as its fast-paced harmony, melody and counterpoint. Graffin and Gurewitz are the band's two main songwriters, though Graffin wrote the bulk of the material on his own for a three-album period in the late 1990s. Gurewitz had left the band in 1994 to concentrate on the future of Epitaph.

After a stint with major label Atlantic Records ended in the early 2000s, Bad Religion re-signed with Epitaph and Gurewitz rejoined. They have since continued to co-write songs and recorded six records: The Process of Belief (2002), The Empire Strikes First (2004), New Maps of Hell (2007), The Dissent of Man (2010), True North (2013), and their latest, Age of Unreason (2019)

Solo career
Graffin recorded a solo album in 1997, called American Lesion, which consisted of softer, more pop-oriented folk songs. Most of this album was written during the breakup of his marriage, and the songs reflect this in lyrics and style.

In 2005, Graffin recorded his second solo album, Cold as the Clay. The album is an amalgamation of new songs by Graffin and 18th- and 19th-century American folk songs. It was produced by Brett Gurewitz and released via ANTI- on July 10, 2006.

In a September 2015 interview, Graffin revealed that he had been working on his third solo album, on which he planned to continue the folk style of Cold as the Clay. That record, Millport, was released on March 10, 2017. It was co-written and produced by Gurewitz and features members of Social Distortion as backing musicians.

Academics
Graffin attended El Camino Real High School, then obtained both his BA Biology, BS Geology and master's in Geology at the University of California, Los Angeles (UCLA). He went on to earn his PhD in Zoology from Cornell University. The PhD dissertation was supervised by William B. Provine. After years of being out-of-print, the title of his dissertation changed to "Evolution and Religion: Questioning the Beliefs of the World's Eminent Evolutionists".

Graffin returned to UCLA where he taught natural science courses. In a June 2008 interview with Bad Religion bassist Jay Bentley, he mentioned that Graffin would be teaching there from January to March 2009. In April 2011, Graffin revealed that he would return to Cornell University that fall to co-teach for 14 weeks.

In 2011 the new type species Qiliania graffini of an extinct bird from the lower Cretaceous was named after Graffin "for his contributions to evolutionary biology, his public out-reach through music, and his inspiration to young scientists around the world".

Work as an author and educator
Graffin received the Rushdie Award for Cultural Humanism from the Harvard Humanist Chaplaincy in 2008. 

Throughout 2003, Graffin was engaged in an ongoing email discussion with Preston Jones, a historian at the Christian John Brown University in Arkansas and fan of Bad Religion.  The informal philosophical debate that resulted was published as a book titled Is Belief in God Good, Bad or Irrelevant? A Professor and Punk Rocker Discuss Science, Religion, Naturalism & Christianity in 2006.

In 2009, Graffin announced that he had co-written a book with American author Steve Olson titled Anarchy Evolution, released on September 28, 2010 (the same day his band Bad Religion released their 15th album The Dissent of Man). In his book, Graffin writes that he is an atheist: "I've never believed in God, which technically makes me an atheist". Although Graffin is not religious, he prefers to identify as a naturalist rather than as an atheist. "Naturalism is a belief system. A lot of scientists bristle at that. We all have to believe we can find the truth. Evidence is my guide. I rely on observation, experimentation and verification." He also filmed and co-produced a television pilot called Punk Professor.

In 2010, he commented on the project, "It's sitting on someone's shelf waiting to be developed. I'm not actually pursuing it. I said, yeah, I'll shoot the pilot, then it's out of my hands."

On March 24, 2012, Bad Religion headlined the Reason Rally in Washington, D.C., where Graffin performed the U.S. national anthem.

Another book entitled Population Wars was released in September 2015. It had been in the works since at least April 2011 and Graffin spoke about it to be "a bit more in depth about the process of evolution". In a November 2015 interview with PopMatters journalist J.C. Maçek III for Graffin's book Population Wars, Graffin stated "I've made a lot of mistakes, but you can't dwell on mistakes because life is about an adventure. It's about discovery. And you learn from your mistakes so unless you're completely shut down to improving your life, I believe you can continue learning until you're very, very old. You have to look at those past missteps as learning experiences."

Discography

Bad Religion

Studio albums
 How Could Hell Be Any Worse? (1982)
 Into the Unknown (1983)
 Suffer (1988)
 No Control (1989)
 Against the Grain (1990)
 Generator (1992)
 Recipe for Hate (1993)
 Stranger than Fiction (1994)
 The Gray Race (1996)
 No Substance (1998)
 The New America (2000)
 The Process of Belief (2002)
 The Empire Strikes First (2004)
 New Maps of Hell (2007)
 The Dissent of Man (2010)
 True North (2013)
 Age of Unreason (2019)

Solo
 American Lesion (1997)
 Cold as the Clay (2006)
 Millport (2017)

Bibliography
A new locality of fossiliferous Harding Sandstone: evidence for freshwater Ordovician vertebrates, Journal of Vertebrate Paleontology, vol. 12, issue 1, pgs. 1–10. (1992)
Evolution, Monism, Atheism and the Naturalist World-View, Polypterus Press (2004)
Is Belief in God Good, Bad, or Irrelevant?, with Preston Jones (2006)
Evolution, Religion and Free Will, with William Provine, American Scientist, vol. 95, issue 4, p. 294 (2007)
Evolution and Religion: Questioning the Beliefs of the World's Eminent Evolutionists, Polypterus Press, Ithaca, N.Y. (2010)
Anarchy Evolution: Faith, Science, and Bad Religion in a World Without God, with Steve Olson (2010)
Population Wars: A New Perspective on Competition and Coexistence (2015)
Punk Paradox: A Memoir, Hachette Books, New York (2022)

See also
 List of celebrities with advanced degrees

References

External links

 
 Greg Graffin interview on NPR

1964 births
Living people
American atheists
American baritones
American people of Irish descent
Bad Religion members
20th-century naturalists
American naturalists
Critics of religions
Cornell University College of Agriculture and Life Sciences alumni
Musicians from Racine, Wisconsin
University of California, Los Angeles alumni
University of California, Los Angeles faculty
Singers from Wisconsin
American punk rock singers
American punk rock guitarists
Folk punk musicians
Evolutionary biologists
21st-century American zoologists
Guitarists from Wisconsin
American male guitarists
El Camino Real High School alumni
20th-century American guitarists
20th-century American zoologists
21st-century naturalists
21st-century American guitarists
21st-century American singers
20th-century American singers
Anti- (record label) artists